Ján Ilavský (born 27 May 1942) is a Slovak cross-country skier. He competed in the men's 50 relay event at the 1972 Winter Olympics.

References

External links
 

1942 births
Living people
Slovak male cross-country skiers
Olympic cross-country skiers of Czechoslovakia
Cross-country skiers at the 1972 Winter Olympics
People from Liptovský Mikuláš District
Sportspeople from the Žilina Region